Before the Rain is a 2010 Australian drama film. The film is an anthology of four short films taking place on a hot day in Sydney just before a rainstorm. 

Each of the four stories was written by a different screenwriter, and directed by a different filmmaker. The directors were Craig Boreham, Nick Clifford, Stephen de Villiers and CJ Johnson, and the writers were Shirley Barrett, Judy Morris, Christopher Lee and Alice Bell.

Plot

Cast
 Jacinta Acevski ... Nicole
 Shai Alexander ... Danny
 Cooper George Amai ... Hugh
 Laurence Brewer ... Harley
 Ryan Corr ... Max
 Kenji Fitzgerald ... Jamie
 Lisa Gormley ... Karin
 Kimberley Hews ... Naomi

External links

2010 films
Australian drama films
2010s English-language films
Films directed by Craig Boreham
Australian anthology films
2010s Australian films